Richard W. Dortch (October 15, 1931 – June 15, 2011) was an Assemblies of God District Superintendent  for Illinois (1970–83) and an Assemblies of God Executive Presbyter (1971–1985).

While pastoring in Alton, Illinois, in 1967, Dortch was elected as secretary-treasurer for the Illinois district of the Assemblies of God, serving  until 1970. He then was Elected to serve as Illinois District Superintendent, a position he held until he resigned in 1983 to work at PTL.

He became Executive Vice President of the PTL Christian evangelical television network in 1983, a network typically featuring speakers affiliated with the Pentecostal movement.

In 1988 he, along with other executives of PTL, was indicted on federal charges of fraud and conspiracy. In a plea bargain, Dortch pleaded guilty to reduced charges and was sentenced to eight years in prison, later cut to two and a half years.  His ministry credentials were restored by the Assemblies of God in 1991.

Dortch wrote several books about personal integrity and restoration. Until just prior to his death he hosted a long-standing two- to three-hours prayer service called "America's Prayer Meeting" on the Christian Television Network.

References

External links 
 Leadership Journal Blind Spot July 1, 1994 Dortch's ministry credentials restored
 The Voice of Prophecy, "Praising God from the Penitentiary", October 8, 2001
 The New York Times Ex-TV Evangelists Are Ousted as Ministers May 7, 1987
 The New York Times Headliners; Facing Judgment December 11, 1988
 The New York Times Bakker Aide Receives 8-Year Fraud Sentence August 25, 1989
 The New York Times Prison Sentence of Top Aide To Bakker Cut to 2½ Years April 26, 1990

1931 births
2011 deaths
American Assemblies of God pastors
American people convicted of fraud
American religious leaders
American television evangelists
Members of the clergy convicted of fraud
American members of the clergy convicted of crimes
People from Granite City, Illinois
Prisoners and detainees of the United States federal government
Protestant religious leaders convicted of crimes
Writers from Illinois